The transistor count is the number of transistors in an electronic device (typically on a single substrate or "chip"). It is the most common measure of integrated circuit complexity (although the majority of transistors in modern microprocessors are contained in the cache memories, which consist mostly of the same memory cell circuits replicated many times). The rate at which MOS transistor counts have increased generally follows Moore's law, which observed that the transistor count doubles approximately every two years. However, being directly proportional to the area of a chip, transistor count doesn't represent how advanced corresponding manufacturing technology is, which is better characterized by transistor density instead (ratio of transistor count of a chip to its area).

, the highest transistor count in flash memory was Micron's 2terabyte  (3D-stacked) 16-die, 232-layer V-NAND flash memory chip, with 5.3trillion floating-gate MOSFETs (3bits per transistor).
The highest transistor count in a single chip processor is of the deep learning processor Wafer Scale Engine 2 by Cerebras, it has 2.6trillion MOSFETs in 84 exposed fields (dies) on a wafer, manufactured using TSMC's  FinFET process.
The highest transistor count in a consumer microprocessor is 114billion transistors, in Apple's ARM-based dual-die M1 Ultra system on a chip, which is fabricated using TSMC's 5 nm semiconductor manufacturing process.
The highest transistor count GPU is Nvidia's H100, built on TSMC's N4 process and totalling 80 billion MOSFETs.

In terms of computer systems that consist of numerous integrated circuits, the supercomputer with the highest transistor count  is the Chinese-designed Sunway TaihuLight, which has for all CPUs/nodes combined "about 400 trillion transistors in the processing part of the hardware" and "the DRAM includes about 12 quadrillion transistors, and that's about 97 percent of all the transistors." To compare, the smallest computer,  dwarfed by a grain of rice, has on the order of 100,000 transistors. Early experimental solid-state computers had as few as 130 transistors but used large amounts of diode logic. The first carbon nanotube computer has 178 transistors and is a 1-bit one-instruction set computer, while a later one is 16-bit (its the instruction set is 32-bit RISC-V though).

Ionic transistor chips ("water-based" analog limited processor), have up to hundreds of such transistors.

There exists an estimate of the total number of transistors manufactured by 2014: ( by 2018).

Transistor count

Microprocessors 

A microprocessor incorporates the functions of a computer's central processing unit on a single integrated circuit. It is a multi-purpose, programmable device that accepts digital data as input, processes it according to instructions stored in its memory, and provides results as output.

The development of MOS integrated circuit technology in the 1960s led to the development of the first microprocessors. The 20-bit MP944, developed by Garrett AiResearch for the U.S. Navy's F-14 Tomcat fighter in 1970, is considered by its designer Ray Holt to be the first microprocessor. It was a multi-chip microprocessor, fabricated on six MOS chips. However, it was classified by the Navy until 1998. The 4-bit Intel 4004, released in 1971, was the first single-chip microprocessor.

Modern microprocessors typically include on-chip cache memories. The number of transistors used for these cache memories typically far exceeds the number of transistors used to implement the logic of the microprocessor (that is, excluding the cache). For example, the last DEC Alpha chip uses 90% of its transistors for cache.

GPUs 
A graphics processing unit (GPU) is a specialized electronic circuit designed to rapidly manipulate and alter memory to accelerate the building of images in a frame buffer intended for output to a display.

The designer refers to the technology company that designs the logic of the integrated circuit chip (such as Nvidia and AMD). The manufacturer refers to the semiconductor company that fabricates the chip using its semiconductor manufacturing process at a foundry (such as TSMC and Samsung Semiconductor). The transistor count in a chip is dependent on a manufacturer's fabrication process, with smaller semiconductor nodes typically enabling higher transistor density and thus higher transistor counts.

The random-access memory (RAM) that comes with GPUs (such as VRAM, SGRAM or HBM) greatly increase the total transistor count, with the memory typically accounting for the majority of transistors in a graphics card. For example, Nvidia's Tesla P100 has 15billion FinFETs (16 nm) in the GPU in addition to 16GB of HBM2 memory, totaling about 150billion MOSFETs on the graphics card. The following table does not include the memory. For memory transistor counts, see the Memory section below.

FPGA 
A field-programmable gate array (FPGA) is an integrated circuit designed to be configured by a customer or a designer after manufacturing.

Memory 

Semiconductor memory is an electronic data storage device, often used as computer memory, implemented on integrated circuits. Nearly all semiconductor memory since the 1970s have used MOSFETs (MOS transistors), replacing earlier bipolar junction transistors. There are two major types of semiconductor memory, random-access memory (RAM) and non-volatile memory (NVM). In turn, there are two major RAM types, dynamic random-access memory (DRAM) and static random-access memory (SRAM), as well as two major NVM types, flash memory and read-only memory (ROM).

Typical CMOS SRAM consists of six transistors per cell. For DRAM, 1T1C, which means one transistor and one capacitor structure, is common. Capacitor charged or not is used to store 1 or 0. For flash memory, the data is stored in floating gate, and the resistance of the transistor is sensed to interpret the data stored. Depending on how fine scale the resistance could be separated, one transistor could store up to 3-bits, meaning eight distinctive level of resistance possible per transistor. However, the fine the scale comes with cost of repeatability therefore reliability. Typically, low grade 2-bits MLC flash is used for flash drives, so a 16 GB flash drive contains roughly 64 billion transistors.

For SRAM chips, six-transistor cells (six transistors per bit) was the standard. DRAM chips during the early 1970s had three-transistor cells (three transistors per bit), before single-transistor cells (one transistor per bit) became standard since the era of 4Kb DRAM in the mid-1970s. In single-level flash memory, each cell contains one floating-gate MOSFET (one transistor per bit), whereas multi-level flash contains 2, 3 or 4 bits per transistor.

Flash memory chips are commonly stacked up in layers, up to 128-layer in production, and 136-layer managed, and available in end-user devices up to 69-layer from manufacturers.

Transistor computers 

Before transistors were invented, relays were used in commercial tabulating machines and experimental early computers. The world's first working programmable, fully automatic digital computer, the 1941 Z3 22-bit word length computer, had 2,600 relays, and operated at a clock frequency of about 4–5 Hz. The 1940 Complex Number Computer  had fewer than 500 relays, but it was not fully programmable. The earliest practical computers used vacuum tubes and solid-state diode logic. ENIAC had 18,000 vacuum tubes, 7,200 crystal diodes, and 1,500 relays, with many of the vacuum tubes containing two triode elements.

The second generation of computers were transistor computers that featured boards filled with discrete transistors, solid-state diodes and magnetic memory cores. The experimental 1953 48-bit Transistor Computer, developed at the University of Manchester, is widely believed to be the first transistor computer to come into operation anywhere in the world (the prototype had 92 point-contact transistors and 550 diodes). A later version the 1955 machine had a total of 250 junction transistors and 1,300 point-contact diodes. The Computer also used a small number of tubes in its clock generator, so it was not the first  transistorized. The ETL Mark III, developed at the Electrotechnical Laboratory in 1956, may have been the first transistor-based electronic computer using the stored program method. It had about "130 point-contact transistors and about 1,800 germanium diodes were used for logic elements, and these were housed on 300 plug-in packages which could be slipped in and out." The 1958 decimal architecture IBM 7070 was the first transistor computer to be fully programmable. It had about 30,000 alloy-junction germanium transistors and 22,000 germanium diodes, on approximately 14,000 Standard Modular System (SMS) cards. The 1959 MOBIDIC, short for "MOBIle DIgital Computer", at 12,000 pounds (6.0 short tons) mounted in the trailer of a semi-trailer truck, was a transistorized computer for battlefield data.

The third generation of computers used integrated circuits (ICs). The 1962 15-bit  Apollo Guidance Computer used "about 4,000 "Type-G" (3-input NOR gate) circuits" for about 12,000 transistors plus 32,000 resistors.

The IBM System/360, introduced 1964, used discrete transistors in hybrid circuit packs. The 1965 12-bit PDP-8 CPU had 1409 discrete transistors and over 10,000 diodes, on many cards. Later versions, starting with the 1968 PDP-8/I, used integrated circuits. The PDP-8 was later reimplemented as a microprocessor as the Intersil 6100, see below.

The next generation of computers were the microcomputers, starting with the 1971 Intel 4004, which used MOS transistors. These were used in home computers or personal computers (PCs).

This list includes early transistorized computers (second generation) and IC-based computers (third generation) from the 1950s and 1960s.

Logic functions 
Transistor count for generic logic functions is based on static CMOS implementation.

Parallel systems 
Historically, each processing element in earlier parallel systems—like all CPUs of that time—was a serial computer built out of multiple chips.  As transistor counts per chip increases, each processing element could be built out of fewer chips, and then later each multi-core processor chip could contain more processing elements.

Goodyear MPP: (1983?) 8 pixel processors per chip, 3,000 to 8,000 transistors per chip.

Brunel University Scape (single-chip array-processing element): (1983) 256 pixel processors per chip, 120,000 to 140,000 transistors per chip.

Cell Broadband Engine: (2006) with 9 cores per chip, had 234 million transistors per chip.

Other devices

Transistor density 
The transistor density is the number of transistors that are fabricated per unit area, typically measured in terms of the number of transistors per square millimeter (mm2). The transistor density usually correlates with the gate length of a semiconductor node (also known as a semiconductor manufacturing process), typically measured in nanometers (nm). , the semiconductor node with the highest transistor density is TSMC's 5 nanometer node, with 171.3million transistors per square millimeter (note this corresponds to a transistor-transistor spacing of 76.4 nm, far greater than the relative meaningless "5nm")

MOSFET nodes

See also 
 Gate count, an alternate metric
 Dennard scaling
 Electronics industry
 Integrated circuit
 List of best-selling electronic devices
 List of semiconductor scale examples
 MOSFET
 Semiconductor
 Semiconductor device
 Semiconductor device fabrication
 Semiconductor industry
 Transistor
Cerebras Systems

Notes

References

External links 
 Transistor counts of Intel processors
 Evolution of FPGA Architecture

Integrated circuits
MOSFETs
Count